Caryocolum srnkai is a moth of the family Gelechiidae. It is found in Montenegro.

References

Moths described in 2011
srnkai
Moths of Europe